The Miracle Centre is a 2020 Nigerian comedy film directed by Niyi Towolawi and co-produced by director himself with Odetoye Bode for Kherut Films. The film stars Yemi Shodimu with Hafeez "Saka" Oyetoro, Ayo Mogaji, Femi Adebayo, and Ayobami "Woli Agba" Ajewole in supporting roles. The film tells the story of Panya Grammar School, where a new teacher Mr Greg meets a corrupt education system where he is going to change it.

The film premiered on 15 February 2020. The film received positive reviews from critics and screened worldwide.

Cast
 Yemi Shodimu as Mr Greg
 Hafeez ‘Saka’ Oyetoro as Vice Principal 
 Ayo Mogaji
 Femi Adebayo
 Ayobami ‘Woli Agba’ Ajewole
 Etinosa Idemudia as Lucy
 Broda Shaggi
 Rotimi Salami 
 Odunlade Adekola as Taxi Driver
 Rachael Okonkwo
 Mary Owen
 Muyiwa Donald
 Chinonso Ukah
 Ralph Niyi

References

External links 
 

2020 films
English-language Nigerian films
2020 comedy films
2020s English-language films